Amigoni may refer to:

 Jacopo Amigoni (1682–1752), also named Giacomo Amiconi, Italian painter of the late-Baroque or Rococo period, who began his career in Venice
 Ottavio Amigoni (16 October 1606 – 28 October 1661), Italian painter of the Baroque period, active in Brescia